Flame in the Streets is a 1961 film directed by Roy Ward Baker and based on the 1958 play Hot Summer Night by Ted Willis. It opened at the Odeon Leicester Square in London's West End on 22 June 1961.

The film depicts an interracial romance in post-war Britain, and a street brawl taking place during Guy Fawkes Night (5 November). The film was made in CinemaScope.

Synopsis
Racial tensions manifest themselves at home, work and on the streets during Bonfire Night, with prejudice and violence directed against the burgeoning West Indian community of post-war Britain. Trade union leader Jacko Palmer fights for the rights of a black worker but struggles with the news that his own daughter, Kathie, is planning to marry a West Indian, much against his own logic and the hysterical prejudice of his wife Nell.

Cast
 John Mills as Jacko Palmer
 Sylvia Syms as Kathie Palmer
 Brenda De Banzie as Nell Palmer
 Earl Cameron as Gabriel Gomez
 Johnny Sekka as Peter Lincoln
 Ann Lynn as Judy Gomez
 Wilfrid Brambell as Mr. Palmer senior
 Meredith Edwards as Harry Mitchell
 Newton Blick as Visser
 Glyn Houston as Hugh Davies
 Michael Wynne as Les
 Dan Jackson as Jubilee
 Cyril Chamberlain as Dowell
 Gretchen Franklin as Mrs. Bingham
 Harry Baird as Billy

Production
Flame in the Streets was produced at Pinewood Studios by the Rank Organisation, with Willis moving the action from the "hot summer night" of his original play to Guy Fawkes Night. Filming began, appropriately, on 5 November 1960. The new title recalled Willis's earlier play No Trees in the Street, which had itself been filmed two years before. Willis also added two characters, Gabriel Gomez and Harry Mitchell, who are only referred to in the play, and opened out the action to include a nocturnal street brawl in the final reel. Producer-director Roy Ward Baker made the film in CinemaScope, with a cast headed by John Mills, Sylvia Syms, Brenda De Banzie, Earl Cameron and Johnny Sekka.

It was one of a number of "girlfriend" parts Syms played around this time.

The addition of the 'brawl' to climax the film, occurring between white Teddy Boys looking for trouble and black West Africans attempting to prevent it, was undoubtedly a direct reflection of the 1958 Notting Hill race riots that had happened just weeks before the play's premiere.

Ward says the title was changed from Hot Summer Nights because they shot it at

Release and Reception

Flame in the Streets opened in London on 22 June 1961, with general release following on 9 July. Daily Herald critic Paul Dehn called it a "terrifying and ferocious film", but in The Spectator Isabel Quigley observed that  "its impact is mild" while conceding that "the obvious visual comparison between the outward and inward flames and fireworks" was effectively handled. Willis's script was nominated for a 'Best British Screenplay' BAFTA award, as well as being novelised by John Burke for Four Square Books.

Baker said "the theme was a bit corny, about the white girl who falls in love with the black man. I thought we did rather well with it actually. But there again it wasn’t really a popular picture because nobody wanted to know. You see it wasn’t a comic in any way. If you make a picture about blacks and whites, there’s got to be something more controversial about it, and there wasn’t really anything in it that was seriously going to provoke an audience into an attitude." The movie marked the end of his contract with Rank.

In his autobiography, The Director's Cut (2000), Roy Ward Baker noted that the film had recently been shown at a Brixton cinema "to mark the 50th anniversary of the arrival in Britain of the steamer Windrush, bringing Caribbeans to work here. ... Some of the older ones [in the audience] testified that it was a true picture of the conditions the incomers faced and in some areas still do face."

References

1961 films
1961 drama films
1960s English-language films
Films directed by Roy Ward Baker
British films based on plays
Films about immigration
Black British films
Films about interracial romance
Films shot at Pinewood Studios
British drama films
Films with screenplays by Ted Willis, Baron Willis
CinemaScope films
1960s British films